Ozark Township is a township in Barton County, Missouri, USA.  As of the 2000 census, its population was 1,102.

The township takes its name from the Ozark Mountains.

Geography
According to the USGS, it contains two cemeteries: Liberal and Yale.

The streams of East Drywood Creek, Fleck Creek and Second Nicolson Creek run through this township.

References

 USGS Geographic Names Information System (GNIS)

External links
 US-Counties.com
 City-Data.com

Townships in Barton County, Missouri
Townships in Missouri